Anis is a masculine given name. The meaning of the name Anis is "genial" or "close friend".

People

In arts
 Anis Mohamed Youssef Ferchichi, German rapper known as Bushido
 Anis Haffar, educational theorist, teacher, columnist and author
 Anis Kachohi (born 1977), French country singer
 Anis Mojgani (born 1977), American spoken-word poet
 Anis Nagi (1939–2010), poet
 Anis Shimada, lead singer of the Japanese band Monoral
 Mir Babar Ali Anis (1802–1874), Urdu poet from northern India

In sport
 Anis Ahmed (born 1973), field hockey player
 Anis Ananenka (born 1985), Belarusian middle-distance runner
 Anis Ayari (born 1982), Tunisian footballer
 Anis Boussaïdi (born 1981), Tunisian footballer
 Anis Riahi (born 1971), Tunisian decathlete
 Anis Selmouni (born 1979), Moroccan athlete

In other fields
 Anis Ahmad (born 1944), social scientist, educationist and professor
 Anis Ahmed (military officer) (born 1947), military officer
 Anis Haffar, educational theorist, teacher, columnist and author
 Anis Kaimkhani, politician
 Anis al-Naqqash (born 1951), Lebanese political analyst
 Mohammed Mohiedin Anis, Syrian car collector

Other uses
 , a coastal tanker
 Ani (bird)
 A short form of Anisette, anise-flavored liqueur

See also
 Anisa (disambiguation) or Anieca, female forms of the name
 Anisur Rahman (disambiguation)

Arabic masculine given names